Cuajiniquil is a district of the Santa Cruz canton, in the Guanacaste province of Costa Rica.

History 
Cuajiniquil was created on 11 November 1974 by Decreto Ejecutivo 4315-G. Segregated from Veintisiete de Abril.

Geography 
Cuajiniquil has an area of  km² and an elevation of  metres.

Villages
Administrative center of the district is the village of San Juanillo.

Other villages in the Cantons are Alemania, Bolillos, Cuajiniquil, Chiquero, Fortuna, Jazminal, Lagarto, Libertad, Limonal, Manzanillo, Marbella, Ostional, Palmares, Piedras Amarillas, Progreso, Punta Caliente, Quebrada Seca, Quebrada Zapote, Rayo, Roble, Rosario, Santa Cecilia, Santa Elena, Socorro, Unión and Veracruz.

Demographics 

For the 2011 census, Cuajiniquil had a population of  inhabitants.

Transportation

Road transportation 
The district is covered by the following road routes:
 National Route 160
 National Route 904

References 

Districts of Guanacaste Province
Populated places in Guanacaste Province